John Lawrence Froggatt (born 13 December 1945) is an English former footballer and manager. A forward, he scored 45 goals in 215 league games in seven seasons in the Football League.

He began his career at Notts County in 1963, and later played for Ilkeston Town and Buxton, before coming to prominence with Boston United between 1969 and 1974. After finishing as Northern Premier League runners-up in 1971–72, they won the league title in 1972–73 and 1973–74. In August 1974, he was signed by Colchester United for a £6,000 fee. Crowned the club's player of the year in 1975, he helped the club to win promotion out of the Fourth Division in 1976–77. He was signed by Port Vale for £10,000 in February 1978, before being sold on to Northampton Town for £8,000 seven months later. He returned to Boston United the following year, and managed the club in three Alliance Premier League campaigns between 1981 and 1984. He later spent two years in charge at Ilkeston Town.

Playing career
Froggatt played for non-league East Kirkby Colliery, before joining Notts County. He played four league games during the relegation season of 1963–64 and subsequent Fourth Division campaign in 1964–65. He dropped out of the Football League to work as a painter and decorator and play part-time for Ilkeston Town and Buxton, before joining Northern Premier League side Boston United in 1969 for a £500 fee. They finished third, two points short of the title, in 1969–70; fourth in 1970–71; second in 1971–72, two points behind champions Stafford Rangers; first in 1972–73 by a nine points margin; and first again in 1973–74 under manager Keith Jobling.

He transferred to Third Division club Colchester United in August 1974 for a £6,000 fee, joining former Boston strike partner Bobby Svarc and former Boston manager Jim Smith at Layer Road. He scored his first Football League goal on 24 August, in a 3–2 defeat by Blackburn Rovers at Ewood Park. He and Svarc continued their strike partnership, and Froggatt scored a hat-trick past Grimsby Town on 15 November, whilst Svarc also scored a brace. He also found the net against Aston Villa in a 2–1 defeat in the League Cup quarter-finals. He started every league game in 1974–75, scoring 18 goals in 54 games in all competitions; Svarc scored 25 to take their partnership to 43 goals for the season.

Svarc and Smith left the club in summer 1975, leaving Froggatt behind at Colchester. The club were relegated under rookie manager Bobby Roberts, and Froggatt scored just five goals from 44 games in 1975–76; this left new signings Bobby Gough and Colin Garwood to pick up the slack. However Roberts led the "U's" to immediate promotion in 1976–77; Frogratt scored eight goals in 52 appearances, though again Garwood and Gough got the bulk of the goals. He added four goals in 34 games in 1977–78 to take his tally for Colchester to 35 goals in 184 games in league and cup competitions.

He was signed by Port Vale manager Bobby Smith for £10,000 in February 1978. Fifteen seconds into his Vale debut; a 4–0 win over Exeter City on 8 February 1978 at Vale Park, and he had scored his first goal for the club. Despite this, he only scored two more goals in eleven further league games in 1977–78, as the "Valiants" were relegated into the basement division. He then lost his first-team place to Ken Beamish and Bernie Wright, and after three appearances under new manager Dennis Butler in 1978–79, Froggatt was sold on to Northampton Town for £8,000 in September 1978. He scored three times for the struggling "Cobblers", before returning to Boston United, where he was made assistant manager.

Style of play
Froggatt was a target-man forward who boasted good pace and ball-control skills.

Managerial career
Frogatt was appointed manager at Alliance Premier League club Boston United in 1981. Under his stewardship, the "Pilgrims" finished tenth in 1981–82, fifth in 1982–83, and seventeenth in 1983–84. He went on to manage Central Midlands League side Ilkeston Town between September 1986 and January 1988.

Statistics

Honours
Individual
Colchester United F.C. player of the year: 1975

Boston United
Northern Premier League: 1972–73 & 1973–74

Colchester United
Football League Fourth Division third-place promotion: 1976–77

References

1945 births
Living people
People from Stanton Hill
Footballers from Nottinghamshire
English footballers
Association football forwards
Notts County F.C. players
Ilkeston Town F.C. (1945) players
Buxton F.C. players
Boston United F.C. players
Colchester United F.C. players
Port Vale F.C. players
Northampton Town F.C. players
English Football League players
Northern Premier League players
National League (English football) players
Association football coaches
English football managers
Boston United F.C. managers
Ilkeston Town F.C. managers
National League (English football) managers